The men's 105 kilograms event at the 2002 Asian Games took place on October 9, 2002 at Pukyong National University Gymnasium.

Schedule
All times are Korea Standard Time (UTC+09:00)

Records

Results

New records
The following records were established during the competition.

References

 2002 Asian Games Official Report, Page 756
 Weightlifting Database
 Men's results

Weightlifting at the 2002 Asian Games